Bianka Bartha-Kéri (born 19 April 1994) is a Hungarian middle-distance runner. She competed in the 800 metres at the 2016 European Athletics Championships.

References

External links
 

1994 births
Living people
Hungarian female middle-distance runners
Place of birth missing (living people)
Hungarian Athletics Championships winners
Athletes (track and field) at the 2020 Summer Olympics
Olympic athletes of Hungary